Luke Francis Kornet (born July 15, 1995) is an American professional basketball player for the Boston Celtics of the National Basketball Association (NBA). He played college basketball for Vanderbilt. He is the all-time leader for blocked shots in the school's history and the NCAA all-time leader for three-pointers made by any player 7 feet tall or taller.

College career
Kornet averaged 8.9 points, 4.8 rebounds and 1.64 blocks over 24.1 minutes in 128 games during his four-year career at Vanderbilt University. During his senior year with the Commodores, he averaged 13.2 points, 6.2 rebounds and 2.00 blocks in 35 starts, earning All-SEC and All-SEC Defensive honors. He holds the NCAA record for three-pointers made by a 7-footer with 150, and is the Commodores' all-time leading shot blocker with 210. On January 12, 2016, Kornet blocked a school-record 10 shots and finished with the second triple-double in Vanderbilt history with 11 points and 11 rebounds, helping the Commodores defeat Auburn 75–57.

Professional career

New York Knicks (2017–2019)
After going undrafted in the 2017 NBA draft, Kornet joined the New York Knicks for the 2017 NBA Summer League. On July 3, 2017, he signed a two-way contract with the Knicks. On February 8, 2018, with his parents in attendance, Kornet made his National Basketball Association debut against the Toronto Raptors in Toronto. He finished with a double-double, scoring 11 points and 10 rebounds in 22 minutes, thus being the second Knicks rookie in history to debut with a double-double. He also finished with four blocks, making him the first player in NBA history to sink three three-pointers and have four blocks in his debut.

On July 6, 2018, Kornet signed a standard contract with the Knicks. On April 9, 2019, Kornet recorded a double-double with 12 points, 13 rebounds, and a career-high six blocks in the Knicks' 96–86 win over the Chicago Bulls.

Chicago Bulls (2019–2021)
On July 17, 2019, Kornet signed a fully guaranteed two-year contract for $4.5 million with the Chicago Bulls.

Boston Celtics (2021)
On March 25, 2021, Kornet was traded to the Boston Celtics in a three-team trade involving the Washington Wizards. He re-signed with the Celtics on October 16, but was waived that day.

Maine Celtics (2021)
On October 23, Kornet signed with the Maine Celtics as an affiliate player. In 10 games, he averaged 11.9 points, 7.5 rebounds, 3.9 assists and 2.7 blocks in 27.4 minutes per contest.

Cleveland Cavaliers (2021–2022)
On December 21, 2021, Kornet signed a 10-day contract with the Cleveland Cavaliers.

Milwaukee Bucks (2022)
On January 3, 2022, Kornet signed a 10-day contract with the Milwaukee Bucks.

Return to Maine (2022)
On January 14, 2022, Kornet was reacquired by the Maine Celtics.

Return to Boston (2022–present)
On February 11, 2022, Kornet signed a contract with the Boston Celtics for the remainder of the season. The Celtics made NBA Finals, where they lost to the Golden State Warriors in six games.

On July 1, 2022, Kornet re-signed with the Celtics.

Career statistics

NBA

Regular season

|-
| style="text-align:left;"| 
| style="text-align:left;"| New York
| 20 || 1 || 16.3 || .392 || .354 || .727 || 3.2 || 1.3 || .3 || .8 || 6.7
|-
| style="text-align:left;"| 
| style="text-align:left;"| New York
| 46 || 18 || 17.0 || .378 || .363 || .826 || 2.9 || 1.2 || .6 || .9 || 7.0
|-
| style="text-align:left;"| 
| style="text-align:left;"| Chicago
| 36 || 14 || 15.5 || .438 || .287 || .714 || 2.3 || .9 || .3 || .7 || 6.0
|-
| style="text-align:left;"| 
| style="text-align:left;"| Chicago
| 13 || 0 || 7.2 || .333 || .261 || .500 || 1.2 || .3 || .2 || .5 || 2.0
|-
| style="text-align:left;"| 
| style="text-align:left;"| Boston
| 18 || 2 || 14.1 || .473 || .250 || .500 || 2.9 || 1.1 || .1 || 1.4 || 4.4
|-
| style="text-align:left;"| 
| style="text-align:left;"| Cleveland
| 2 || 0 || 7.5 || .200 || .000 || .667 || 1.5 || .5 || .0 || .5 || 2.0
|-
| style="text-align:left;"| 
| style="text-align:left;"| Milwaukee
| 1 || 0 || 6.0 || .000 ||  ||  || 1.0 || .0 || .0 || .0 || .0
|-
| style="text-align:left;"| 
| style="text-align:left;"| Boston
| 12 || 0 || 7.1 || .571 || .000 || .667 || 2.1 || .7 || .3 || .2 || 2.2
|-
| style="text-align:center;" colspan="2"|Career
| 148 || 35 || 14.3 || .408 || .324 || .753 || 2.6 || 1.0 || .3 || .8 || 5.5

Playoffs

|-
| style="text-align:left;"| 2021
| style="text-align:left;"| Boston
| 2 || 0 || 2.5 || 1.000 ||  || .500 || 1.5 || .0 || .0 || .0 || 1.5
|-
| style="text-align:left;"| 2022
| style="text-align:left;"| Boston
| 9 || 0 || 2.1 || .750 || 1.000 ||  || .6 || .1 || .0 || .0 || .8
|- class="sortbottom"
| style="text-align:center;" colspan="2"|Career
| 11 || 0 || 2.2 || .800 || 1.000 || .500 || .7 || .1 || .0 || .0 || .9

College

|-
| style="text-align:left;"|2013–14
| style="text-align:left;"|Vanderbilt
| 30 || 2 || 15.4 || .344 || .236 || .533 || 2.3 || .8 || .3 || .6 || 4.0
|-
| style="text-align:left;"|2014–15
| style="text-align:left;"|Vanderbilt
| 35 || 14 || 21.6 || .495 || .400 || .764 || 3.4 || 1.1 || .2 || 1.1 || 8.7
|-
| style="text-align:left;"|2015–16
| style="text-align:left;"|Vanderbilt
| 28 || 25 || 27.4 || .403 || .280 || .690 || 7.3 || 1.5 || .5 || 3.0 || 8.9
|-
| style="text-align:left;"|2016–17
| style="text-align:left;"|Vanderbilt
| 35 || 35 || 31.5 || .406 || .327 || .857 || 6.2 || 1.2 || .5 || 2.0 || 13.2
|- class="sortbottom"
| style="text-align:center;" colspan="2"|Career
| 128 || 76 || 24.1 || .417 || .320 || .779 || 4.8 || 1.1 || .4 || 1.6 || 8.9

Personal life
Kornet is the son of former Vanderbilt and NBA player Frank Kornet and Nashville television news anchor Tracy Kornet. His sister Nicole played basketball at Oklahoma and UCLA. He also has a brother named John.

References

External links

 Vanderbilt Commodores bio

1995 births
Living people
American men's basketball players
Basketball players from Texas
Boston Celtics players
Centers (basketball)
Chicago Bulls players
Cleveland Cavaliers players
Maine Celtics players
Milwaukee Bucks players
New York Knicks players
People from Denton County, Texas
Power forwards (basketball)
Sportspeople from the Dallas–Fort Worth metroplex
Undrafted National Basketball Association players
United States men's national basketball team players
Vanderbilt Commodores men's basketball players
Westchester Knicks players